Louise Gilman Hutchins (1911–1996) was president and board director for the Mountain Maternal Health League in Berea, Kentucky for 47 years.

Family and early life
Louise Gilman Hutchins was born February 2, 1911, to Episcopal missionaries in Changsha, Hunan Province, China.  The family lived there until 1926, when they returned to the United States, moving to New Jersey.  During her time in Changsha, China, Louise would meet Francis Hutchins and the two married in 1934.

In 1932, Hutchins graduated from Wellesley College and in 1936, earned her M.D. in pediatrics and obstetrics from Yale University.  Following her graduation from Yale, Dr. Hutchins returned to China to work with her new husband, Francis, who had been engaged in aid work in the region since meeting Louise years earlier.  In Changsha, she completed an internship in pediatrics at the Hunan Hospital.  In 1939, Francis Hutchins was offered the presidency of Berea College and after initial reluctance, the couple left China for Kentucky.

Mountain Maternal Health League
In Berea, Hutchins served as the only pediatrician in the community from 1939 to 1967. Soon after her arrival in the community, Hutchins became the board president and medical director for the Mountain Maternal Health League and continued in that role for 47 years.  The Mountain Maternal Health League, established in 1936, served rural women in Estill, Harlan, Garrard, Jackson, Lincoln, Madison, Powell, Rockcastle, and Whitley counties.  The League offered medical services to women in these communities by traveling to reach geographically isolated patients.  Most of their work, however, involved providing contraception information in their clinic while providing refills on contraceptive supplies via mail.  During this time, Kentucky law prohibited government officials from funding or disseminating birth control information.

In 1944, the Mountain Maternal Health League established a clinic in Berea Hospital and soon after, became affiliated with Planned Parenthood Federation of America.  In 1967, Francis Hutchins retired from Berea College and the couple moved to Hong Kong for three years.  During this time, Louise Hutchins completed a residency in gynecology while working with the city's Family Planning Association.  The couple returned to Berea in 1970 and until her death at age 85 in 1996, Louise Hutchins continued to work to improve the health of women and children in Kentucky.

See also
 Birth control movement in the United States

References

1911 births
1996 deaths
American expatriates in China
American birth control activists
American obstetricians
American pediatricians
Women pediatricians
People from Berea, Kentucky
People from Changsha
Wellesley College alumni
Yale University alumni
Kentucky women in health professions